River Jones is an American producer, musician, and owner of River Jones Music / Atomic Milk Records.

History
Jones began playing and working with music at the age of five. He was heavily into rock music as a youth. Starting at 19, he began a three-year internship at Elektra Records. He also worked at Maverick Records, Grand Royal, and V2 Music, where he held a number of music industry positions.

River recorded a solo album in Austin, Texas, and collaborated with actress Lorelei Linklater.

River Jones Music
From 2002 until 2005, River was a professional musician drumming for Katy Rose on V2 Records and Nettwerk Management in Los Angeles.

In 2008, Jones began playing in a local riot grrl band, and soon met local musician Courtney Marie Andrews. He teamed up with Andrews to produce her first album, on his new label River Jones Music. The album Urban Myths, which was recorded, printed, and produced by Jones out of an apartment June 2008. Andrews's second full length Painters Hands and a Seventh Son was recorded, produced, and released by Jones exactly one year later. He soon began to sign other acts.

BMG began administering River's solo music in 2018. Jones released his first EP on Austin, Texas label Atomic Milk during SXSW 2019.

References

Further reading
River Jones in "Austin.com" (August 5, 2016)
Mtv: River Jones (January 4, 2015)
Ovrld: Pass the Time (May 27, 2015)
Austin Town Hall: River Jones Tune Blows Up (July 22, 2016)
SXSW: River Jones and Lorelei Linklater (January 4, 2017)
Anon Magazine: River Jones Radio Waves (March 3, 2016)
State Press: RJM and Friends Festival (February 2, 2011)
Phoenix New Times: River Jones, What Are You Listening To? (August 19, 2011)
New Times: KUKQ Phoenix Locks in Programming Schedule (May 15, 2012)

External links

Phoenix New Times: Interview with River Jones (August 2011)

American rock drummers
Living people
21st-century American singers
21st-century American male singers
Year of birth missing (living people)
American male songwriters